Leonid Lakerbaia (born 1 January 1947 in Kutaisi), was the Prime Minister of Abkhazia in the Government of President Ankvab from 27 September 2011 until his resignation on 2 June 2014 following the 2014 Abkhazian political crisis. Lakerbaia is also chairman of the socio-political movement Aitaira (since 2001).

Before becoming Prime Minister, Lakerbaia was Vice-Premier and First Vice-Premier in the government of President Bagapsh (since 24 February 2005) and he was Minister for Foreign Affairs from 29 June 1995 until 31 July 1996 in the Government of President Ardzinba. Lakerbaia was nominated by the People's Party to stand in the 1999 Presidential election but was refused registration by the Central Election Commission, allowing President Vladislav Ardzinba to run unopposed for a second term.

References

|-

1947 births
1st convocation of the People's Assembly of Abkhazia
2nd convocation of the People's Assembly of Abkhazia
Aitaira politicians
Ministers for Foreign Affairs of Abkhazia
Living people
People from Kutaisi
politicians from Kutaisi
Prime Ministers of Abkhazia
First Vice Premiers of Abkhazia
Vice Premiers of Abkhazia